Clostera inclusa, the angle-lined prominent moth, many-lined prominent or poplar tentmaker, is a moth of the family Notodontidae. The species was first described by Jacob Hübner in 1831. It is found in North America, including Arkansas, Colorado, Florida, Georgia, Illinois, New Hampshire, New York, North Carolina, Oklahoma, Ontario, Oregon, Pennsylvania, South Carolina and Virginia.

The wingspan is 25–32 mm. Adults are grayish brown with a tuft of brown hairs on the thorax.

The larvae feed on various Salicaceae species. They are gregarious. Young larvae skeletonize the leaves of their host plant, feeding under silken tents. Later, they eat whole leaves. Full-grown larvae are 35–44 mm long. They are lavender gray to light brown to nearly black with a shiny black head. The species overwinters as a pupa in a thin, silken cocoon on the ground.

Gallery

References

Moths described in 1831
Notodontidae
Moths of North America